The third season of the animated television series The Legend of Korra, titled Book Three: Change, was created by Michael Dante DiMartino and Bryan Konietzko, and consists of thirteen episodes ("chapters"), all animated by Studio Mir. The season began airing on Nickelodeon in the U.S. on June 27, 2014. After leaked episodes and following declining ratings, the series stopped airing on Nickelodeon after episode 8 on July 25, 2014. Episodes 9 to 13 of Book Three were subsequently made available on the Internet weekly through Nickelodeon's website and on digital download platforms.

The season takes place largely in the Earth Kingdom, one of the four major nations in the setting of the series, while depicting the re-emergence of airbending among people of other nations. The season's antagonists are the "Red Lotus", a group of dangerous anarchists led by the new airbender Zaheer who wants to overthrow the world's governments and the Avatar. Among the season's supporting characters are the now elderly Zuko (a character from the original series) and the family of Lin Beifong's sister Suyin.


Episodes

Cast and Characters

Main 

 Janet Varney as Avatar Korra
 David Faustino as Mako 
 P.J. Byrne as Bolin
 Mindy Sterling as Lin Beifong
 J.K. Simmons as Tenzin
 Seychelle Gabriel as Asami Sato
 Kiernan Shipka as Jinora
 Skyler Brigmann as Kai

Recurring 

 Bruce Davison as Fire Lord Zuko
 Logan Wells as Meelo
 Darcy Rose Byrnes as Ikki
 Richard Riehle as Bumi
 Lisa Edelstein as Kya
 John Michael Higgins as Varrick
 Stephanie Sheh as Zhu Li
 Henry Rollins as Zaheer
 Anne Heche as Suyin Beifong
 Grey DeLisle as Ming'hua
 Peter Giles as Ghazan
 Kristy Wu as P'Li
 Alyson Stoner as Opal Beifong

Production

Design
Book Three was the first season of The Legend of Korra to be created with a full in-house design and revision team, an expansion from the 25 to 30 people who worked for the series at Nickelodeon for seasons 1 and 2.

The design for the armless waterbender Ming-Hua was based on Bryan Konietzko's friend Michi, and Opal's hairstyle was based on that of Dolly Haas. The location of Zaofu, Suyin Beifong's metal-domed city, was inspired by Lake Louise in Canada's Banff National Park, and the exterior of Lake Laogai, the site of the Dai-Lin's headquarters, was modeled on Lake Tahoe.  

The sand shark from which Korra and Asami flee in episode 10 is based on the sarcastic fringehead, a small fish found in the Pacific. For reasons of time, the designers re-used the design for Zuko and Iroh's apartment in Ba Sing Se from Avatar: The Last Airbender for the apartment of Mako and Bolin's family in episode 11. Another concept taken from the previous series, although not depicted there, was the notion of "becoming wind" as a high-level airbending form, which was included in the series bible of Avatar.

The idea of restraining the Avatar in X-shaped chains, as seen in the season finale, was originally conceived for the scene of Aang being captured by the Fire Nation in the first season of Avatar, but was then vetoed by the network. It was allowed this time, according to Konietzko, after he complained about seeing a shot of SpongeBob SquarePants, another Nickelodeon character, similarly restrained.

Animation
In creating the animation, Studio Mir was assisted by its subsidiary Studio Reve for some episodes.

Cast and characters
Book Three introduced many new characters that would recur until the end of the series, including the extended Beifong family and Jinora's romantic interest, the orphaned thief Kai, named after writer Josh Hamilton's son. Bryan Konietzko was worried about introducing him because of the growing roster of characters and his similarity to Aang. 

Also according to Konietzko, beginning with Book Three, the series became a more visible property and was able to retain more well-known actors. Anne Heche auditioned and was cast for Suyin Beifong, Lin's estranged sister, and Jon Heder auditioned for the minor role of the apathetic adolescent airbender Ryu. Henry Rollins expressed interest for auditioning for the role of the season's main antagonist Zaheer, calling Konietzko and DiMartino from a tour to pose questions about the character.

Writing
The season's title, Change, was inspired by a Taoist motto, "the only constant is change", reflecting the changes in Korra's world as a result of her opening the spirit portals in season 2 and the reemergence of airbending, as well as the change of Korra as a person. The writers considered and rejected including a flashback to the Red Lotus's attempted kidnapping of Korra as a child, and also cut a scene of Asami and Lin sneaking into the airship in episode 4.

The amount of exposition scenes in Book Three worried the writers because of the danger of boring audiences. According to Konietzko, most notes from Nickelodeon amounted to "more fighting, more action!". The writers intended to set aside the love triangle among the main characters for Book Three and focus on Korra and Asami becoming friends. In addition, they began to allude to the possibility of a mutual attraction between the two that would result in them becoming romantically linked in the final moments of the series.

Reception
Book Three received critical acclaim, with review aggregator Rotten Tomatoes calculating a 100% approval rating for the season from 9 reviews and an average rating of 9.5/10.

At Blu-ray.com, Kenneth Brown described Book Three as "a spectacular season of thrills, laughs, heartache, sophisticated storytelling, masterful world-building [and] harrowing battles", noting that with this season, the series was finally "standing shoulder to shoulder with Avatar: The Last Airbender". Describing a "sense of deep, unwavering confidence driving the entire series", with story, animation, dialogue and music coming together to "stunning ends", he wrote that as the protagonists entered early adulthood, the series adapted to see them overcome challenges in a much more seasoned and complicated manner that was not to be expected from a Nickelodeon series.

Max Nicholson for IGN described the third season as "easily the show's most consistent season to date, delivering complex themes, excellent storylines and unmatched production values." Writing for The Escapist, Mike Hoffman noted how the series respected its younger viewers by explicitly showing, but also giving emotional weight to the death of major characters, including "one of the most brutal and sudden deaths in children's television" in the case of P'Li in season 3. By portraying Korra's opponents, including the Red Lotus, not as stereotypical villains but as human beings with understandable motivations corrupted by an excess of zeal, the series trusted in viewers to be able to "resolve the dissonance between understanding someone's view and disagreeing with their methods". And, Hoffman wrote, by showing Korra to suffer from "full-on depression" at the end of the third season, and devoting much of the fourth to her recovery, the series helped normalize mental health issues, a theme generally unaddressed in children's television, which made them less oppressive for the viewers.

References

The Legend of Korra
2014 American television seasons